The Visual Effects Society Award for Outstanding Supporting Visual Effects in a Motion Picture is one of the annual awards given by the Visual Effects Society starting from 2002.

Winners and nominees

2000s

2010s

2020s

References

S
Awards established in 2002